Henry Sidney Downs was an amateur British bodybuilder in the 1950s and 1960s. He won the Mr. Universe title in 1960.

References

External links
Photo of Downs from Getty Images, circa 1955.

Year of birth missing (living people)
Living people
British bodybuilders
People associated with physical culture
Place of birth missing (living people)